Mehatpur is a village in Jalandhar district in the Indian state of Punjab. the 2011 Census of India, the population was 5,804 people across 1186 households. It is 8 km away from Nakodar on National Highway 71 (NH-71).

Geography
Mehatpur has a humid subtropical climate with cool winters and hot summers. Summers last from April to June and winters from November to February. Temperatures in the summer vary from average highs of around 45 °C to average lows of around 30 °C. Winter temperatures vary from highs of 19 °C to lows of 2 °C. The average annual rainfall is about 60 cm.

Education
The city contains 12 schools in English and Punjabi (CBSE & PSEB affiliated). Moreover, school buses are available for students for nearby villages.

Demographics
The first language of most people in the city is Punjabi. Punjabi is the official language of  Mehatpur.
People from different cultures are settling here, enriching the city with new languages such as Hindi and English.
Majority of population  belongs to the Sikh religion.

—— Religious Places
Baba Ram Malo Ji, Sant-Sadhar, Gurdwara - Samra Patti, Gurudwara Halti Wala Khurampur, Gurudwara Ber Sahib shahpur, Ramgarhia Mandir, Dera Garib Dasi dham, Gurudawara Shri Guru Ravidass ji in dhangara patti.

References

Villages in Jalandhar district
Villages in Nakodar tehsil